Rheinpark is an urban park along the right bank of the Rhein in Cologne, Germany.

Rheinpark may also refer to:

 Rheinpark Stadion, the national sports stadium in Vaduz, Liechtenstein
 Rheinpark in Düsseldorf-Golzheim
 Rheinpark high-rise apartment complex in Birsfelden, Switzerland

See also
Neuss Rheinpark-Center station, North Rhine-Westphalia, Germany